Trestles is a collection of surfing spots between northern San Onofre State Beach in San Diego County and southern San Clemente in Orange County in California.  Trestles consists of, from north to south, Upper Trestles (Uppers), Lower Trestles (Lowers), and Middle Trestles (Middles). North of Upper Trestles is the surf spot called Cottons. South of Middles is the surf spot called The Church. Middles gets its name because it was a middle area between Trestles (both Uppers and Lowers breaks) and The Church (sometimes just called "Church". It is named after Trestles Bridge, a wooden trestle bridge that surfers must walk under to reach the beach, replaced in 2012 by a concrete viaduct.

Lower Trestles consistently has the best waves of the group. For many years there was an WSL World Tour surfing competition held at Lowers every year, as well as the NSSA Nationals. Uppers is less consistent, but it has the potential to be a good wave with a long ride.  North of Uppers is Cotton's Point, the location of former President Richard Nixon's home, La Casa Pacifica, aka "The Western White House", and the associated surfing spot of Cottons.

Access and amenities
Trestles has two major access points:

Visitors can park and walk down an asphalt trail to Trestles from the trailhead at Cristianitos Road, near where Cristianitos crosses over the San Diego Freeway. Visitors can expect to see surf graffiti on the sidewalk, with such phrases as "no kooks", "surf hard", "you're going the wrong way",  and "duckbutter". There is a pay parking lot near the Carl's Jr. restaurant on Coast Highway at Cristianitos, along with some public parking on streets near the restaurant. There is no fee to walk, skateboard, or bike into Trestles by means of this trail. Most visitors enter Trestles by this trail.
Visitors can park at San Onofre State Beach by exiting the San Diego Freeway at Basilone Road, then heading west from the freeway exit to the entrance to the portion of San Onofre State Beach named Surf Beach. The hike northwest to Trestles from Surf Beach at San Onofre State Beach is considerably longer than the hike southwest from the Cristianitos Road bridge and the San Diego Freeway. There is a fee to drive into the State Park at Surf Beach.

Plant and animal life
 
Trestles park is home to a variety of plant and animal life. The most common plant is the coastal sage scrub, which is native to the coast of California and thrives in the area's Mediterranean climate. Trestles park is also home to quite a lot of animal life,  including California brown pelicans. These animals used to be endangered species, but the populations recovered so well that the species was removed from the endangered species list in 2009. During times of heavy rains, there is usually a river delta flowing into the ocean where there are often tadpoles.

One plant which grows right out of the sand is the beach evening primrose. Each plants creates a large mat of roots and foliage which is an extremely important aspect of the ecosystem as other plants are able to grow from the stable surface this plants provides. The primrose can be identified by its bright yellow, four petaled flowers which open in the morning, and turn reddish as evening progresses. The primrose has unique medical benefits as well. These flowers aid in the treatment of sore throat and eye diseases.

Seasonal stream
During periods of strong rain, Trestles has a stream that runs through its center and empties into the ocean. Usually, the stream flows during the winter and spring, the seasons with the most rain in Southern California. The stream does not contain much marine life as it dries up without a steady water source. The stream creates a small pool which contains mainly tadpoles. When the stream dries up above ground, an underground water flow still exits into the ocean, just not through a river delta.

Trestles has experienced problems with littering. Many visitors leave trash in the dried stream bed. When the stream flows, it brings the waste into the ocean and onto the beach. Trestles has numerous signs reminding visitors to dispose of waste properly.

Toll road controversy
The California Transportation Corridor Agency (TCA) has sought to construct a 16-mile long six-lanes wide toll highway (graded for eight lanes) through San Onofre State Beach/Park and a habitat reserve in Orange County, joining the San Diego Freeway at Trestles.

The Toll Road, which is one of several routes that could be constructed to extend California State Route 241, is favored by several business groups and public officials from Orange County as a way to ease future traffic congestion. The particular Toll Road route through San Onofre is opposed by more than two dozen members of California's congressional delegation in Washington, D.C., thirty-eight California legislators including former California United States Senator Barbara Boxer, Surfrider Foundation, Defenders of Wildlife, The Sierra Club, The Natural Resources Defense Council, the California State Parks Foundation, the California State Park and Recreation Commission the Native American United Coalition to Protect Panhe, The City Project, the Save San Onofre Coalition, and Save Trestles, among others.  Opposition is based upon the damage to the environment that would result from construction and operation of the Toll Road, the loss of park camping and recreational areas, the loss/damage to a site sacred to Native Americans, and studies that show that traffic congestion would actually increase on the San Diego Freeway if the toll road is built through San Onofre Beach. A survey of Orange County voters revealed that while 52% favored a connection in some capacity, 66% opposed the proposed route that would take the Toll Road through San Onofre State Park.

On February 6, 2008, the California Coastal Commission denied a Coastal Permit for the route of the proposed 241 Toll Road that would have cut through San Onofre and the Reserve, saying that of the eight possible routes considered, the one sought by the TCA was the most environmentally damaging. Had a permit been granted, it would have been the first toll road to run through a California state park. On December 18, 2008, The Department of Commerce announced that it would uphold the California Coastal Commission's ruling that found the TCA's proposed extension of the 241 Toll Road inconsistent with the California Coastal Act. The Department of Commerce noted in a release that at least one reasonable alternative to the project existed, and that the project was not necessary in the interest of national security. On May 22, 2013, environmentalists filed a new lawsuit to stop the building of the Toll Road in segments, a tactic they say is an illegitimate end-run around by the TCA after the Toll Road was defeated in 2008.

Panhe is the site of an ancient Acjachemen village in the San Mateo campground area of San Onofre State Beach, straddling the San Diego-Orange county border off Cristianitos Road near Trestles. It remains a sacred, ceremonial, cultural, and burial site for the Acjachemen people. Many Acjachemen people trace their lineage back to Panhe. It is the site of the first baptism in California, and in 1769, the first close contact between Spanish explorers, Catholic missionaries, and the Acjachemen people. The Acjachemen people built the mission at San Juan Capistrano.
The advocacy group Save Panhe and San Onofre State Beach state that not only is Panhe one of the most historically significant sacred sites of the Acjachemen people, but that Panhe is also important to all Californians and Americans.

In popular culture

 Trestles is mentioned in the 1963 Beach Boys' song Surfin' U.S.A.

References

External links
Map of proposed toll road alignment

Geography of San Diego County, California
Surfing locations
Surfing locations in California